Mesbahuddin Ahmad is a Bangladeshi academic. He has been a fellow of Bangladesh Academy of Sciences since 1997 and was the president of the academy during 2012–2015. He was the vice-chancellor of Gono University from 2008 to 2016.

Education and career
Ahmad completed his master's in chemistry from the University of Dhaka in 1958. He obtained his Ph.D. from University of Ottawa in organic chemistry in 1963.

He joined the University of Dhaka as a lecturer in 1959. He was an associate professor of the University of Chittagong from 1969 to 1972, when he became a faculty member of Jahangirnagar University.

References 

Living people
University of Dhaka alumni
Ottawa University alumni
Fellows of Bangladesh Academy of Sciences
Academic staff of the University of Dhaka
Academic staff of the University of Chittagong
Academic staff of Jahangirnagar University
Year of birth missing (living people)